Lucas González Amorosino (born 2 November 1985) is an Argentine rugby union player who plays fullback or wing.

He was part of the Argentina sevens team before joining Leicester in 2009 following his full international début against  that summer.

Career

2009–10 season
He was given a trial by Leicester before the start of the 2009/10 season, he was later given a full contract ahead of French international Nicolas Jeanjean who was also at Leicester on a trial basis at the time.

González Amorosino made an instant impression, scoring 4 tries in his first 6 matches, including 2 in the opening two rounds of the Heineken Cup and one in Leicester's win against a South African touring XV at Welford Road.

However he suffered a stress fracture in his leg early in November in an LV Cup match and missed the 2010 November internationals. The Argentina management hit out at Leicester for playing him in two matches in three days.

He returned from his injury in January 2010 but from this point onwards he played very little for Leicester, despite the good start to his career at Leicester.

González Amorosino played for Argentina during the 2010 mid year tests against Scotland and France, starting 2 of the 3 matches.

2010–11 season
Lucas was given very few chances in his second season, he played just 3 matches in which he scored 2 tries. He played for Argentina during the 2010 November internationals, and played well setting up a try against in the Pumas victory over Italy.

He left Leicester at the end of the season and joined French Top 14 side Montpellier in search of game time. On Amorosino's departure the Leicester coach Richard Cockerill commented "he has not developed and come on as well as we would have both liked." However it could be said that Amorosino was unfairly ignored during his time at Leicester. In total Amorosino scored 6 tries in 11 starts for Leicester.

González Amorosino played for Argentina in the 2011 mid year tests and was selected for the 2011 Rugby World Cup.

2011–12 season
Lucas played for Argentina in the 2011 Rugby World Cup, and played in all the Pumas matches apart from the first match against England. He was named man of the match against Romania, earning himself a place on the bench against Scotland. Against Scotland he scored the late match winning try for Argentina to help them through to the quarter finals, the try was seen as one of the best of the tournament. Amorosino made the second highest linebreaker throughout the World Cup.

Once González Amorosino arrived back from the World Cup to his new club Montpellier, he started very well and was named by French rugby newspaper Midi Olympique as the player of the round 12.

2015–16 season

He was part of Argentine squad for the 2015 Rugby World Cup in England.

In October 2015, it was announced that González Amorosino had joined Irish Pro12 side Munster on a three-month contract. Amorosino made his European Rugby Champions Cup debut on 14 November 2015, coming off the bench in Munster's opening 2015–16 pool game against Treviso.

Jaguares
At the conclusion of González Amorosino's Munster contract, he was announced as a member of the  squad for the 2016 Super Rugby season.

References

External links
ERC profile
Biography, December 2011

1985 births
Living people
Argentine rugby union players
Leicester Tigers players
Montpellier Hérault Rugby players
Oyonnax Rugby players
Cardiff Rugby players
Munster Rugby players
Jaguares (Super Rugby) players
Argentina international rugby union players
Rugby union players from Buenos Aires
Argentine expatriate rugby union players
Argentine expatriate sportspeople in France
Argentine expatriate sportspeople in England
Argentine expatriate sportspeople in Wales
Expatriate rugby union players in France
Expatriate rugby union players in England
Expatriate rugby union players in Wales
Rugby union fullbacks
Rugby union wings
Argentina international rugby sevens players
American Raptors players